The Bank Clerk is a 1919 American short comedy film directed by and starring Fatty Arbuckle. The film is considered to be lost.

Cast
 Roscoe 'Fatty' Arbuckle
 Molly Malone

See also
 List of American films of 1919
 Fatty Arbuckle filmography

References

External links

1919 films
1919 short films
1919 comedy films
1919 lost films
American silent short films
American black-and-white films
Silent American comedy films
American comedy short films
Films directed by Roscoe Arbuckle
Films with screenplays by Roscoe Arbuckle
Lost American films
Lost comedy films
1910s American films